The 1920–21 Swiss International Ice Hockey Championship was the sixth edition of the international ice hockey championship in Switzerland. HC Rosey Gstaad won the championship by defeating HC Bellerive Vevey in the final.

Championship

Semifinals 
 HC Rosey Gstaad - EHC St. Moritz 6:1
 HC Bellerive Vevey - HC Château-d'Oex 3:1

Final 
 HC Rosey Gstaad - HC Bellerive Vevey 8:1

External links 
Swiss Ice Hockey Federation – All-time results

International
Swiss International Ice Hockey Championship seasons